Roger III (1175 – 24 December 1193), of the House of Hauteville, was the eldest son and heir of King Tancred of Sicily and Queen Sibylla. He was made Duke of Apulia (as Roger V), probably in 1189, shortly after his father's accession. In the summer of 1192 he was crowned co-king with his father. Follari were minted at Messina bearing both Tancred and Roger's names as kings.

In 1193, Tancred arranged for Roger to marry Irene Angelina, daughter of the Byzantine emperor Isaac II Angelos. Roger died on 24 December 1193, upsetting his father's plans. Tancred quickly had Roger's younger brother, William III, crowned as co-king, but Tancred died on 20 February 1194. On 20 November 1194, the Emperor Henry VI entered Palermo and on 25 December William was deposed. In 1197 Roger's widow, Irene, married Henry VI's brother, Duke Philip of Swabia.

Notes

1175 births
1193 deaths
12th-century Kings of Sicily
Italo-Normans
Hauteville family
Sons of kings